The Best of Sixteen Volt  is a compilation album by 16volt, released on May 10, 2005 by Cleopatra Records. It comprises songs from the band's first four releases as selected by fans through the band's website. Disc two was recorded live in 2003 at the Cabaret Metro, Chicago.

Reception

Stewart Mason of AllMusic gave The Best of Sixteen Volt: 1993-2003 two and a half out of five stars and the album "only for the most die-hard genre purists; the addition of an 11-track live set recorded at Chicago's Cabaret Metro in 2003 might entice hardcore fans who already have the songs on disc one, which makes its muddy sound (Powell's vocals are largely inaudible, and not in the way that vocals are usually buried in the mix in this style of music) and sloppy performances something of an insult."

Track listing

Personnel
Adapted from The Best of Sixteen Volt liner notes.

16volt
 Joel Bornzin – acoustic drums (1, 3)
 John "Servo" DeSalvo – drums
 Jon Fell – additional guitars (2)
 Marc LaCorte – guitars (10)
 Eric Powell – lead vocals, guitars, programming, production, recording, mixing
 Mike Peoples – bass guitar, guitars
 Jeff Taylor – guitars (5, 6, 7)
 William Tucker –  guitars (10)
 Von Vinhasa – acoustic drums (6, 7)

Additional performers
 Bryan Barton – sampler (10)
 A.P. Boone – sampler (1)
 Dan Pred – acoustic drums (9)
 Stella – vocals (8)
 Chris Thomas – guitars (1, 3)
 Kraig Tyler – guitars
 Chris Vrenna – live drums (Tracks 12, 13, 14, 15)
 Clint Walsh – stage guitars

Production and design
 Keith Auerbach – recording, mixing
 Bill Kennedy – recording, mixing
 Tony Lash – recording, mixing
 Jeff "Critter" Newell – recording, mixing
 Dave Ogilvie – recording, mixing

Release history

References

External links 
 
 

16volt albums
2005 greatest hits albums
2005 live albums
Cleopatra Records compilation albums
Cleopatra Records live albums